This is a list of seasons of Swedish ice hockey club Skellefteå AIK.

Ske